Balza (Balya) is a rural locality (a village) in Leninsky Selsoviet, Kuyurgazinsky District, Bashkortostan, Russia. The population was 142 as of 2010. There are 5 streets.

Geography 
Balza is located 14 km northeast of Yermolayevo (the district's administrative centre) by road. Alexandrovsky is the nearest rural locality.

References 

Rural localities in Kuyurgazinsky District